KJEF may refer to:

 Jefferson City Memorial Airport (ICAO code KJEF)
 KJEF (AM), a radio station (1290 AM) licensed to serve Jennings, Louisiana, which held the call sign KKRC from 2019 to 2020 and previously held the call sign KJEF from 1951 to 2019.
 KJEF-CA, a defunct low-power television station (channel 13) formerly licensed to serve Jennings, etc., Louisiana, United States.